Manuel Siles Artés (January 9, 1921 - May 28, 1984) was a Spanish writer.

People from the Province of Almería
1921 births
1984 deaths